Mehmed Fuad Carim (1892; Ottoman Aleppo - 1972; Istanbul, Turkey) was a Turkish politician and diplomat. On 1 June 1934, he was appointed as the Turkish Consul-General at Marseilles and remained there until 30 May 1945.

See also 
Behiç Erkin
Necdet Kent
Selahattin Ülkümen
Namık Kemal Yolga

References 

People from Aleppo
1892 births
1972 deaths
20th-century Turkish diplomats
Mekteb-i Mülkiye alumni